Inanidrilus triangulatus is a species of annelid worm. It is known from subtidal fine coral sands in the Atlantic coast of Florida between Miami and Key Largo.

References

triangulatus
Invertebrates of the United States
Taxa named by Christer Erséus
Fauna of the Atlantic Ocean
Animals described in 1984